Kargar is a surname. Notable people with the surname include:

Abbas Kargar (born 1956), Iranian former footballer
Amirhossein Kargar (born 1998), Iranian footballer
Mohammad Shakir Kargar (born 1967), Afghan politician
Mohammad Yousef Kargar (born 1963), Afghan football manager
Mohsen Haji Hassani Kargar (1988–2015), Iranian Qari
Rangina Kargar (born 1985), Afghan politician

See also 
Kargar Boneh Gaz F.C., Iranian football club
Kargar Metro Station (Isfahan), Station on Isfahan Metro
Kargar Street, is the main street of Amir Abad and is one of the longest streets of Tehran